Before the fertilized ovum reaches the uterus, the mucous membrane of the body of the uterus undergoes important changes and is then known as the decidua. The thickness and vascularity of the mucous membrane are greatly increased; its glands are elongated and open on its free surface by funnel-shaped orifices, while their deeper portions are tortuous and dilated into irregular spaces. The interglandular tissue is also increased in quantity, and is crowded with large round, oval, or polygonal cells, termed decidual cells.  Their enlargement is due to glycogen and lipid accumulation in the cytoplasm allowing these cells to provide a rich source of nutrition for the developing embryo. Decidual cells are also thought to control the invasion of the endometrium by trophoblast cells.

Experimentally, human endometrial stromal cells can be decidualized in culture by using analogs of cAMP and progesterone. The cells will exhibit a decidualized phenotype and display upregulation of common decidualization markers such as prolactin and IGFBP1.

References

External links
  - "Female Reproductive System: placenta, decidual cells"
 

Developmental biology